Harbin–Mudanjiang intercity railway is a high-speed railway in Heilongjiang Province, China, between the cities Harbin and Mudanjiang. Starting in Harbin, it leads east to Acheng, into mountains at Mao'ershan, to Shangzhi, again through the mountains to the southeast, Weihe, Yabuli, Hengdaohezi, Hailin and on to the end at Mudanjiang station. Future proposals for this line could see it extended across the border into Russia and the Russian port city of Vladivostok.

Overview
Harbin–Mudanjiang intercity railway is a joint venture by the China Railway Corporation, the Heilongjiang Provincial government and Harbin Railway Bureau.
 February 2014, Approval for the project given by China's National Development and Reform Commission and it is expected to need a total investment of 36.52 billion RMB. The project is expected to start construction in 2015, with completion due by 2019. 
 November 5, 2014 - Special project feasibility report was officially approved by the National Development and Reform Commission.
 December 15, 2014 - Construction site officially started on the line near  Hailin Gantt town Weihushan exit tunnel.
 December 25, 2018 - Started to operate.

After the opening of the railway, the Harbin to Mudanjiang journey time would be around one hour, Harbin to Suifenhe (on the border with Russia) will have a travel time of two hours.

Stations
Harbin, Xinxiangfang North, Acheng North, Mao'ershan, Shangzhi South, Yimianpo North, Weihe West, Yabuli West, Hengdaohezi East, Hailin North, Mudanjiang West(reserved site) and Mudanjiang.

References

High-speed railway lines in China
Rail transport in Heilongjiang
Standard gauge railways in China